Micro may refer to:

Measurement 
 micro- (μ), a metric prefix denoting a factor of 10−6

Places
 Micro, North Carolina, town in U.S.

People
 DJ Micro, (born Michael Marsicano) an American trance DJ and producer
Chii Tomiya (都宮 ちい, born 1991), Japanese female professional wrestler, ring name Micro

Arts, entertainment, and media
 Micro (comics), often known as Micro, a character in Marvel Comics
 Micro (novel), techno-thriller by Michael Crichton, published posthumously in 2011 
 Micro (Thai band), a Thai rock band formed in 1983
 IEEE Micro, a peer-reviewed scientific journal

Brands and enterprises
 Micro Cars, Sri Lankan automobile company, established 1995
 Micro Center, an American computer department store, established 1979
 Micro ISV (mISV or μISV), a term for a small independent software vendor
 Micro Mobility Systems, Swiss company producing kickscooters

Computing
 Micro, a mostly-obsolete term for a microcomputer, e.g.:
BBC Micro
 BBC Micro Bit, or micro:bit, an ARM-based embedded system for computer education  
 MICRO Relational Database Management System, an early set-theoretic database management system
 Micro T-Kernel, μT-Kernel, a real-time operating system

Other uses
 MICRO (organization), a non-profit organization 
 Micro, type of bus transport in Lima, Peru
 AAA battery, known as a micro cell
 Micro kart, a one-passenger mini go-kart
 Game Boy Micro, a 2005 Nintendo handheld and the final model in the Game Boy line
Microbrew, a beer from a small brewery

See also 
 
 
 Macro (disambiguation)
 Micromachinery
 Microstate
 Micros Systems
 Mikro (disambiguation)
 Mikra (disambiguation)